Sanjeev Singh Kohli (born 30 November 1971) is a British actor, comedian, and writer. He is best known for his role as shopkeeper Navid Harrid in the BBC sitcom Still Game (2002–2007, 2016–2019), Ramesh Majhu in the radio sitcom Fags, Mags and Bags (2007–present), and A.J. Jandhu in the BBC Scotland soap opera River City (2015–present). Since 2019, Kohli has hosted his own television talk show Sanjeev Kohli's Big Talk, on the BBC Scotland channel.

Early life 
Kohli was born in London to a social worker and a teacher, who had emigrated to the United Kingdom in 1966 from India. When he was three years old, they moved to Scotland.
Kohli's parents could afford to move him, aged six, and his brothers to be educated by the Jesuits at St Aloysius' College, a Roman Catholic school in Central Glasgow. To pay for their children's education, Kohli's parents ran a corner shop.

He attended Glasgow University, initially to study Medicine, but changed course to study Mathematics, gaining a first-class degree, and subsequently studied for a PhD.

Career 
Kohli starred as Surjit Magoon in Meet the Magoons, co-written by his brother Hardeep, for Channel 4. and has appeared in several episodes of the BBC comedy series Look Around You as Synthesizer Patel. He is a former presenter of the BBC's Asian Network and has previously written for Goodness Gracious Me, The Big Breakfast and Chewin' the Fat, which was also written by future Still Game co-stars, Ford Kiernan and Greg Hemphill.

In December 2006, the Sunday Mail revealed that Kohli would be starring in a major ITV thriller, Losing Gemma. Starring alongside Alice Eve, he played "a member of the British High Commission, who helps a young British tourist jailed in Delhi, India". Kohli revealed in 2007 that he would be working on a radio comedy project for BBC Radio 4, entitled Fags, Mags and Bags. The series was broadcast in 2008 and was nominated for a Sony Award. The Daily Record also revealed Kohli would be writing for ITV children's show, My Life as a Popat. Kohli has also starred in BBC Three's Rush Hour as an intolerant taxicab driver, and on the same channel in Phoo Action as a television news presenter.

On 21 August 2007, he presented a show called 10 Things To Hate About The Edinburgh Festival. Kohli also sometimes appears as a pundit on BBC One Scotland's Saturday afternoon Sportscene football programme. Kohli made a brief cameo in a speaking role as himself in an episode of BBC's VideoGaiden, where he received a fish in the mail as a gift from the hosts in an attempt to recreate the Nintendo game Animal Crossing. One of the hosts was Robert Florence, a writer whom Kohli worked with on Chewin' the Fat.

In February 2008, it was announced that he would play the role of God in the video for Glasgow band Attic Lights single "God."

In 2011, Kohli appeared on the Scottish tea-time magazine show The Hour on STV. He co-hosted in two separate weeks (ten episodes), alongside main presenter Michelle McManus.

In 2012, he appeared on the Channel 4 comedy programme Fresh Meat as a dentistry lecturer Dr Minaj.

In 2014, Kohli joined the rest of the cast of Still Game in the comeback live show at the SSE Hydro in Glasgow. There were 21 performances of the sold-out show.

In October 2015, Kohli made his first appearance as A.J. Jandhu in the Scottish soap opera River City.

Since April 2019, he has hosted Sanjeev Kohli's Big Talk on the BBC Scotland channel.

Filmography

Personal life

Kohli currently lives in Glasgow with his wife, Fiona, and their three children.

He has two elder brothers — Randeep Singh Kohli (b. 1966), a senior police officer with the Metropolitan Police in London, and Hardeep Singh Kohli (b. 1969), who is also a journalist and broadcaster and lives in Edinburgh.

References

External links 
 

1971 births
Scottish male television actors
Living people
Scottish Sikhs
Alumni of the University of Glasgow
Scottish people of Indian descent
British people of Indian descent
People educated at St Aloysius' College, Glasgow
Punjabi people
Scottish male comedians
Male actors from Glasgow
Scottish male soap opera actors
People from Bishopbriggs
British male actors of Indian descent